Ing. Janka Keseg Števková (born 4 February 1976 in Martin) is a Slovak cross-country mountain biker. At the 2012 Summer Olympics, she competed in the Women's cross-country at Hadleigh Farm, finishing in 21st place.

References

External links
Official website (in Slovak)
MTB Cross-country profile 

Slovak mountain bikers
Slovak female cyclists
1976 births
Living people
Olympic cyclists of Slovakia
Cyclists at the 2004 Summer Olympics
Cyclists at the 2008 Summer Olympics
Cyclists at the 2012 Summer Olympics
Sportspeople from Martin, Slovakia
Cyclo-cross cyclists